Surendra Nagar may refer to:

Surendra Singh Nagar (born 1965), Indian politician from Uttar Pradesh
Surendranagar district, an administrative district in Saurashtra region, Gujarat, India
Surendranagar Lok Sabha constituency, Gujarat, India
Surendranagar Dudhrej, a municipality in Surendranagar district, Gujarat, India